The pedal piano (or piano-pédalier or pédalier,) is a kind of piano that includes a pedalboard, enabling bass register notes to be played with the feet, as is standard on the organ.

There are two broad types of pedal pianos: either the pedal board may be an integral part of the instrument, using the same strings and mechanism as the manual keyboard (e.g. the 19th century Érard pedal grand piano and Pleyel upright pedal piano), or it may consist of two independent pianos (each with its separate mechanics and strings) which are placed one above the other, either a regular piano played by the hands and a bass-register piano played by the feet (e.g. the 18th century pedal piano owned by Wolfgang Amadeus Mozart and the 21st century Doppio Borgato made by Luigi Borgato), or two standard pianos of which the lower one is played from a pedalboard which acts on its (manual) keyboard through a special mechanism (e.g. the 21st century Pinchi Pedalpiano System).

History 

The origins of the pedal piano are found in the pedal clavichord and pedal harpsichord, of which an original of the former survives while only descriptions and modern reproductions of the latter remain. The first citation of a clavichord with pedalboard appeared around 1460 in a section dedicated to musical instruments in an encyclopedic treatise written by the scholar Paulus Paulirinus (1413-1471). Organists would use these instruments for practice when no-one was available to work the bellows for a church organ or, in the wintertime, to avoid having to practice in an unheated church. Johann Sebastian Bach owned a pedal harpsichord, and his organ trio sonatas BWV 525–530, Passacaglia and Fugue in C minor BWV 582, and other works can be played on the instrument.

Wolfgang Amadeus Mozart owned a fortepiano with independent pedals, built for him in 1785 by Anton Walter. His father refers to this in a letter to his daughter on March 12, 1785. The autographed manuscript of the Concerto in D minor K 466, composed the same year, shows a series of chords for the left hand plus bass notes an octave lower, covering about 2 1/2 measures. Some believe that the bass notes were intended for the pedal, but there is disagreement about this interpretation. The additional bass notes could be regarded as the original version which was not crossed out when Mozart decided to replace them with chords. And since the pedal was strictly for his own, largely extemporaneous, use there would be no reason to write out notes.

Louis Schone made a pedalflügel for Robert Schumann in 1843, when he was in Dresden. Schumann preferred an upright pedal piano, and his pedal keyboard had 29 notes and was connected with an action placed at the back of the piano where a special soundboard, covered with 29 strings, was built into the case. Schumann wrote much music for the pedal piano and was so enthusiastic about the instrument that he convinced Felix Mendelssohn, who owned a grand pedal piano, to form a class devoted to it in the Leipzig Conservatory. Charles-Valentin Alkan owned an Erard pedal piano made in 1853 and now in the Musée de la Musique, the historic instrument collection of the Conservatoire de Paris. Alkan composed a number of works for it, in the virtuoso style to be found in his other piano music. Kevin Bowyer has revived some of this music in recent years, though he plays it on the organ.

The instrument never became very popular in the 1900s, and it remains a rarity. It is mostly used to enable organists to practice at home, rather like the pedal harpsichord and clavichord were centuries ago, instead of being used to play the pedal piano repertoire. In the 2000s, pedal pianos are made in Italy by Luigi Borgato (who reinvented and patented it). This company makes the Doppio Borgato, an independent bass-register instrument connected to a pedal board, on which a concert grand can be placed. Borgato expanded the register of the bass piano to 37 notes, A0 to A3 (rather than the standard 30 or 32 on an organ).   On September 13, 2011 Italian pianist Roberto Prosseda presented the modern premiere of the Concerto for pedal piano and orchestra by Charles Gounod with Orchestra Arturo Toscanini conducted by Jan Latham Koenig. 
On April 27, 2012, the Pinchi Pedalpiano System, designed by Claudio Pinchi and Roberto Prosseda, and built by the organ building enterprise Fratelli Pinchi Ars Organi, was presented in a public performance by Roberto Prosseda. It is a pedalboard which works with any two standard 88-key grand pianos. The Pinchi pedalboard has 37 pedals (from A to A three octaves up) but the Pinchi Pedalpiano System has a total range of five octaves, thanks to 61 wooden "fingers", as can be seen in the adjacent picture, which play, that is depress, the lower 61 keys (A0 to A5) of the lower piano, and which "fingers" are mapped to the 37 note pedalboard in three independent three octave stops (A0-A3 for 16', A1-A4 for 8', and A2-A5 for 4').

Performers 
In recent years, performance of works for the pedal piano on that instrument, as opposed to on organ, has increased. Recent performers on the pedal piano include the American organist and pianist Dana Robinson, Jean Dubé, Olivier Latry, the American organist Peter Sykes, the German organist Martin Schmeding, the Slovenian organist and harpsichordist Dalibor Miklavčič, the American pianist John Khouri, Jean Guillou, Cameron Carpenter, and Roberto Prosseda.

Mark Whitty of Australia built his own electric piano with 15 bass pedals in 1980. In the 1990s, he converted it for MIDI, controlling a Roland piano module running into a Yamaha 200w p/ch stereo mixer amplifier, with the keyboard panned left and right and the pedals panned center.

Compositions for pedal piano

19th century
Alexandre Pierre François Boëly (1785–1858)
 12 Pieces, Op. 18
 Ernst Richter (1808–1879)
 3 Preludes and Fugues, Op. 21
Robert Schumann (1810-1856)
Studien, Op. 56
Skizzen, Op. 58
6 Fugues on B-A-C-H, Op. 60
Franz Liszt (1811–1886)
Fantasie und Fuge über den Choral "Ad nos, ad salutarem undam" from Meyerbeer's "Prophet"
Charles Valentin Alkan (1813-1888)
12 Études pour les pieds seulement
Benedictus in D minor, Op. 54
13 Prières, Op. 64
11 Grands Préludes et une transcription du "Messiah" de Händel, Op. 66
Impromptu sur le choral de Luther "Ein feste Burg ist unser Gott", Op. 69
Bombardo-Carillon for pedal-piano, four feet (or piano four hands)
Charles Gounod (1818-1893)
Fantasie sur l'hymne national russe for pedal-piano and orchestra
Suite Concertante for pedal-piano and orchestra
Danse Roumaine for pedal-piano and orchestra
Concerto in E flat major for pedal-piano and orchestra
Marcia Solenne for pedal-piano
Larghetto for violin, viola, cello and piano with pedalboard
  (1822–1909)
 6 Fugues, Op. 37
 Passacaglia
 Théodore Salomé (1834–1896)
 10 Pièces pour orgue ou piano-pédalier, Volume 1
 10 Pièces pour orgue ou piano-pédalier, Volume 2
 12 Pièces nouvelles pour orgue ou piano-pédalier, Op. 59
Camille Saint-Saëns (1835–1921)
Concerto for pedal piano and orchestra (First version of the 2nd Piano Concerto)
 Théodore Dubois (1837–1924)
 12 Pièces pour orgue ou piano-pédalier
 12 Pièces nouvelles pour orgue ou piano-pédalier
 Filippo Capocci (1840–1911)
 10 Pièces pour orgue ou piano-pédalier
  (1853–1904)
 15 Pièces pour orgue ou piano-pédalier
Léon Boëllmann (1862–1897)
 12 Pieces, Op. 16

21st century
Cameron Carpenter
"Cameron Carpenter"
Franco Oppo (1935-2016)
"Freu dich sehr o meine Seele" (2000)
Jean Guillou (1930-2019)
"Epitases" (2002)
Charlemagne Palestine
Compositions for pedal piano (2005)
Ennio Morricone
Studio IV bis (2011)
Andrea Morricone
Omaggio a J.S.B. (2011)
Cristian Carrara
Magnificat for pedal piano and orchestra (2011)
Nimrod Borenstein
 Fireworks, for pedal piano (2011)
Michael Glenn Williams
 Tip-Tap (2011)
Francesco Trocchia
 Trio Op. 15 n. 1 for pedal piano, cello and French horn (2013)
 Diapositive di una metamorfosi for pedal piano, violin and cello (2014)
Michael Bakrnčev
 Fünf Charakterstücke für Pedalflügel (Five Character Pieces for Pedal Piano) (2016) Dedicated to Italian pianist Roberto Prosseda.
Johannes Skudlik
"Johannes Skudlik transcriptions"

Anything written for Pipe Organ can be played on the Pedal Piano right off the bat from the Original Sheet Music.

See also
:Category: Pedal piano players
:Category: Composers for pedal piano

References

External links 
Wall Street Journal article on Roberto Prosseda and pedal-piano renaissance
"Classic FM article about the pedal-piano renaissance"
Borgato website - makers of pedal pianos
Mendelssohn and Schumann's pedal pianos 
Pianos weird and wonderful
Video reportage about pedal piano of Finnish TV SUUTO, Jan 17, 2013
 Free scores featuring the pedal piano at the International Music Score Library Project (IMSLP)

Piano
Keyboard instruments